Reverend William Walter Watts (1856–1920) was one of New South Wales's greatest authorities on moss. He might be best known for his unfinished Census of Australian Mosses. The fern genus Revwattsia is named in his honour as are at least 30 other species including the fern species Grammitis wattsii.

Further reading

References 

Bryologists
20th-century Australian botanists
1856 births
1920 deaths
19th-century Australian botanists